This page gathers the results of elections in Trentino-Alto Adige/Südtirol.

Regional/provincial elections
Since a constitutional reform of 2001, regional elections are nothing more than two separate provincial elections and the Regions does not provide anymore vote totals regionwide.

Latest provincial elections

Trentino

South Tyrol

List of previous regional/provincial elections
1948 Trentino-Alto Adige/Südtirol regional election
1952 Trentino-Alto Adige/Südtirol regional election
1956 Trentino-Alto Adige/Südtirol regional election
1960 Trentino-Alto Adige/Südtirol regional election
1964 Trentino-Alto Adige/Südtirol regional election
1968 Trentino-Alto Adige/Südtirol regional election
1973 Trentino-Alto Adige/Südtirol regional election
1978 Trentino-Alto Adige/Südtirol regional election
1983 Trentino-Alto Adige/Südtirol regional election
1988 Trentino-Alto Adige/Südtirol regional election
1993 Trentino-Alto Adige/Südtirol regional election
1998 Trentino-Alto Adige/Südtirol regional election
2003 Trentino-Alto Adige/Südtirol provincial elections
2008 Trentino-Alto Adige/Südtirol provincial elections
2013 Trentino-Alto Adige/Südtirol provincial elections

Italian general elections in Trentino-Alto Adige/Südtirol

Latest general election

List of previous general elections
1946 Italian general election in Trentino-Alto Adige/Südtirol
1948 Italian general election in Trentino-Alto Adige/Südtirol
1953 Italian general election in Trentino-Alto Adige/Südtirol
1958 Italian general election in Trentino-Alto Adige/Südtirol
1963 Italian general election in Trentino-Alto Adige/Südtirol
1968 Italian general election in Trentino-Alto Adige/Südtirol
1972 Italian general election in Trentino-Alto Adige/Südtirol
1976 Italian general election in Trentino-Alto Adige/Südtirol
1979 Italian general election in Trentino-Alto Adige/Südtirol
1983 Italian general election in Trentino-Alto Adige/Südtirol
1987 Italian general election in Trentino-Alto Adige/Südtirol
1992 Italian general election in Trentino-Alto Adige/Südtirol
1994 Italian general election in Trentino-Alto Adige/Südtirol
1996 Italian general election in Trentino-Alto Adige/Südtirol
2001 Italian general election in Trentino-Alto Adige/Südtirol
2006 Italian general election in Trentino-Alto Adige/Südtirol
2008 Italian general election in Trentino-Alto Adige/Südtirol
2013 Italian general election in Trentino-Alto Adige/Südtirol

European Parliament elections in Trentino-Alto Adige/Südtirol

Latest European Parliament election

List of previous European Parliament elections
1979 European Parliament election in Trentino-Alto Adige/Südtirol
1984 European Parliament election in Trentino-Alto Adige/Südtirol
1989 European Parliament election in Trentino-Alto Adige/Südtirol
1994 European Parliament election in Trentino-Alto Adige/Südtirol
1999 European Parliament election in Trentino-Alto Adige/Südtirol
2004 European Parliament election in Trentino-Alto Adige/Südtirol
2009 European Parliament election in Trentino-Alto Adige/Südtirol
2014 European Parliament election in Trentino-Alto Adige/Südtirol

References